Carlos Alberto Fernandes (born 8 December 1979), known simply as Carlos, is an Angolan professional footballer who plays as a goalkeeper.

Club career
Born in Kinshasa, Zaire, Carlos started his career as a striker, subsequently moving into goalkeeper upon replacing an injured teammate. He started playing professionally with lowly U.D. Vilafranquense, having a short stint with S.C. Campomaiorense in the second division afterwards.

Carlos then returned to the lower leagues, with Amora FC. After a string of good performances with F.C. Felgueiras in the second level (sharing teams with Marcelo Moretto, later of S.L. Benfica), he signed with Primeira Liga's Boavista F.C. for the 2004–05 season.

At Boavista, Carlos was initially backup to veteran William Andem, but eventually won starting honours. This prompted a January 2006 move to Romania's FC Steaua București, thus becoming the first Portuguese player to have played in the country's Liga I. Shortly after his arrival, he lost the confidence of fans and general manager Mihai Stoica alike, with the latter declaring at a TV show that the player, although greatly underachieving, had been put under immense pressure due to the fact of being the team's only foreigner; he was released and rejoined Boavista on 30 May 2007, having previously trained for a time with Charlton Athletic to remain fit.

In 2007–08, after losing first-choice status to Liechtensteiner Peter Jehle, Carlos was loaned to Foolad F.C. in January 2008, with the move being made permanent the following campaign – the Iran Pro League club was coached by compatriot Augusto Inácio.

After spending one year in Iran, Carlos moved back to Portugal in the summer of 2009, joining Rio Ave FC. He only missed two league games, as the Vila do Conde side retained their top-division status.

International career
Through his grandmother, Carlos chose to represent Angola at international level, the first cap coming in 2009 at nearly 30 years of age. He represented his adopted nation at the following year's Africa Cup of Nations, played on home soil.

Carlos was also the starter in the 2012 Africa Cup of Nations tournament, participating in the first two games but missing the third due to yellow card accumulation, as the Palancas Negras exited in the group stage.

References

External links

1979 births
Living people
Angolan people of Portuguese descent
21st-century Democratic Republic of the Congo people
Portuguese sportspeople of Angolan descent
Portuguese footballers
Angolan footballers
Footballers from Kinshasa
Association football goalkeepers
Primeira Liga players
Liga Portugal 2 players
Segunda Divisão players
U.D. Vilafranquense players
S.C. Campomaiorense players
Amora F.C. players
F.C. Felgueiras players
Boavista F.C. players
Rio Ave F.C. players
C.D. Feirense players
Moreirense F.C. players
Amarante F.C. players
Vilaverdense F.C. players
G.D. Vitória de Sernache players
Liga I players
FC Steaua București players
Persian Gulf Pro League players
Foolad FC players
Süper Lig players
Bucaspor footballers
Girabola players
C.R. Caála players
Portugal B international footballers
Angola international footballers
2010 Africa Cup of Nations players
2012 Africa Cup of Nations players
Portuguese expatriate footballers
Angolan expatriate footballers
Expatriate footballers in Romania
Expatriate footballers in Iran
Expatriate footballers in Turkey
Portuguese expatriate sportspeople in Romania
Portuguese expatriate sportspeople in Iran
Portuguese expatriate sportspeople in Turkey